Mohammad Ismail Khan may refer to 

 Mohammad Ismail Khan (Indian politician), a 19th-century Indian politician
 Mohammad Ismail Khan (Afghan politician), an Afghan government minister